The City Tavern is a late-20th century building designed to be the replica of the historic 18th-century tavern and hotel building which stood on the site. It is located at 138 South 2nd Street in Philadelphia, at the intersection of Second and Walnut Streets, near Independence Hall. The original 18th century building was frequented by the Founding Fathers of the United States and other distinguished people. High-profile events took place there, including the first anniversary celebration of the 4th of July.

The original building was partially burned down in the 19th century and the remains were demolished in 1854. Located in Independence National Historical Park, the present recreation was opened in 1976 for the American Bicentennial and operated as a restaurant which used typical 18th century recipes. The City Tavern temporarily closed during the COVID-19 pandemic in 2020.

History
The original structure housed a business which John Adams called the "most genteel tavern in America", and it was a favorite meeting place of some of the Founding Fathers and members of the First Continental Congress. The land on which City Tavern was built was conveyed in 1772 by Samuel Powel to a group of seven wealthy citizens, and the building was completed by subscription at a cost of more than £3,000.

In the lead-up to the American Revolution, on May 20, 1774, more than 200 men gathered in the gallery of the building to respond to the request for assistance from Bostonians following the passage of the Boston Port Bill. Many other important events took place at the building in the first few decades of the new nation; for example, the first Fourth of July celebration was held at the building in 1777, marking the anniversary of America's Independence from Britain, and General George Washington first met the Marquis de Lafayette at City Tavern in 1777.

The building was partially destroyed by fire on March 22, 1834, and was completely demolished by 1854. The present building was constructed in the 1970s and opened in 1976 for the United States Bicentennial as a functioning tavern and restaurant. From 1994 to 2020, it was operated by Walter Staib, a chef and host of the television shows A Taste of History and Black Forest Cuisine: The Classic Blending of European Flavors.

The Tavern closed in 2020 because of a severe downturn in business due to the COVID-19 pandemic. The National Park Service put the property up for a new lease in 2022.

See also
 List of Washington's Headquarters during the Revolutionary War

References

External links
 

Taverns in Pennsylvania
Buildings and structures in Independence National Historical Park
American Revolutionary War museums in Pennsylvania
Old City, Philadelphia
Taverns in the American Revolution
Restaurants in Philadelphia
Landmarks in Philadelphia
History of Philadelphia
Culture of Philadelphia
Replica buildings
1773 establishments in Pennsylvania
18th-century architecture in the United States
Federal architecture in Pennsylvania